The  Congaline Carnival was a nine-day carnival held in the area of Dover Beach on the Caribbean island of Barbados. The Carnival was held annually at the end of April. It was first held in 1994 and celebrated its last year in 2004. The carnival included local musicians, street activities, markets, and exhibitions, as well as free entertainment.

References

Folk festivals in Barbados
Carnivals in Barbados
Spring (season) events in Barbados